Nikos Marinakis (born 12 September 1993) is a Greek professional footballer who plays as a right-back for Super League club OFI.

Club career

Marinakis comes from Panathinaikos's youth ranks. He promoted to the first team on 28 June 2012, signing a contract which keeps him in Panathinaikos until 2015.
On 7 August 2014, Marinakis signed for Niki Volos on a season-long loan deal, but he returned to Panathinaikos on 2 January 2015. On 10 March 2016, the right defender of Panathinaikos renewed his contract with the club, which was expiring at the end of season, until the summer of 2017. On 1 March 2017, thanks to a close-range header from the right defender in the additional time, Panathinaikos won 1–0 Asteras Tripolis on the road to the final of the Greek Cup. It was the first goal of the player with the club in all competitions. On 14 June 2017, Marinakis mutually solved his contract with Panathinaikos.

On 26 June 2017, Marinakis signed a three-year contract with Panetolikos.

On 2 July 2019, Marinakis signed a three years' contract sith OFI for an undisclosed fee.

Career statistics

Club

Honours
Panathinaikos
Greek Cup: 2013–14

International
Greece U19
UEFA European Under-19 Championship runner-up: 2012

References

External links

Myplayer.gr Profile

1993 births
Living people
Greece youth international footballers
Greece under-21 international footballers
Niki Volos F.C. players
Panathinaikos F.C. players
Panetolikos F.C. players
OFI Crete F.C. players
Super League Greece players
Footballers from Heraklion
Greek footballers
Association football midfielders